Grange Hill is a settlement in Jamaica, located in the parish of Westmoreland. It has a population of 7,190 as of 2009. It is the birthplace of Reggae legend Peter Tosh.

References

Populated places in Westmoreland Parish